Kavalan may refer to:

 Kavalan people, an indigenous people of Taiwan
 Kavalan language, formerly spoken by the Kavalan people
 Kavalan distillery, a whisky distillery in Taiwan

See also
 Kaavalan, a 2011 Indian film in Tamil language Starring Vijay